Seinfeld is an American television sitcom created by Jerry Seinfeld and Larry David. Seinfeld has been described by some as a "show about nothing", similar to the self-parodying "show within a show" of fourth-season episode "The Pilot". Jerry Seinfeld is the lead character and played as a fictionalized version of himself. Set predominantly in an apartment block on New York City's Upper West Side, the show features a host of Jerry's friends and acquaintances, which include George Costanza, Elaine Benes, and Cosmo Kramer, who are portrayed by Jason Alexander, Julia Louis-Dreyfus, and Michael Richards, respectively.

The series debuted on July 5, 1989, on NBC, as The Seinfeld Chronicles. The pilot episode was met with poor reviews, and as a result, NBC passed on the show. However, NBC executive Rick Ludwin believed the series had potential and therefore gave Seinfeld a budget to create four more episodes, which formed the rest of season 1 and began airing on May 31, 1990. The first season is considered the smallest sitcom order in television history. During its nine-year run, 180 episodes of Seinfeld were produced. The count includes both halves of three one-hour episodes, including the finale, and two retrospective episodes, each split into two parts: "The Highlights of 100", covering the first 100 episodes; and "The Clip Show", also known as "The Chronicle", which aired before the series finale. On November 25, 2004, a special titled The Seinfeld Story was broadcast. This marked the first appearance of Seinfeld on NBC since its series finale in 1998. The final episode aired on May 14, 1998. The streaming rights for all 180 episodes of the series transferred from Hulu to Netflix in 2021.

Series overview

Episodes

Season 1 (1989–90)

Season 2 (1991)

Season 3 (1991–92)

Season 4 (1992–93)

Season 5 (1993–94)

Season 6 (1994–95)

Season 7 (1995–96)

Season 8 (1996–97)

Season 9 (1997–98)

Ratings

References
General sources

Notes 

Specific sources and notes

External links
 
 

Seinfeld